Eero Johannes Häkkinen (4 November 1911 – 19 August 1976) was a Finnish politician, born in Suonenjoki. He was a Member of the Parliament of Finland from 1966 to 1970, representing the Social Democratic Party of Finland (SDP).

References

1911 births
1976 deaths
People from Suonenjoki
People from Kuopio Province (Grand Duchy of Finland)
Social Democratic Party of Finland politicians
Members of the Parliament of Finland (1966–70)